Laura Jane Ballance (born February 22, 1968) is the bassist in the rock band Superchunk (also contributing occasional backing vocals) and co-founder of Merge Records along with Mac McCaughan. In 2013 she announced that she would no longer be touring with the band due to her worsening hyperacusis.

Musical history 
Despite her hyperacusis and announcement that she will no longer be touring with the band, she has remained in Superchunk since 1989. Their latest album is Wild Loneliness, released in February 2022.

Merge Records 
In 1989, Ballance alongside her bandmate Mac McCaughan, founded Merge Records for releases from Superchunk and similar artists. Ballance has also contributed to the book Our Noise: The Story of Merge Records (2009) with Mac McCaughan and John Cook.

Personal life 
Ballance has described herself as an introvert as a child, who found punk music as a teenager through a music video by Adam and the Ants. Ballance lives in Durham, North Carolina with her husband and daughter.

References 

Merge Records artists
Living people
1968 births
American rock bass guitarists
Musicians from Raleigh, North Carolina
Women bass guitarists
Merge Records
Guitarists from North Carolina
20th-century American bass guitarists
20th-century women musicians
Superchunk members